Lewisdale is an unincorporated community in Prince George's County, Maryland, United States. For statistical purposes, it is considered part of the Chillum census-designated place (CDP). Lewisdale is a neighborhood contained between the Northwest Branch Anacostia River to the east, East West Highway to the south, University Boulevard to the north, and Riggs Road to the west.

Neighborhood Character
The Lewisdale neighborhood generally consists of medium, one to two-story red-brick houses. Lewisdale neighborhood also includes two apartment complexes: the Newbury Square Apartment Complex and University City Apartment Complex.

Education

1.  Lewisdale Elementary School (Grades Pre-K through 6)

Parks and Recreation
  Riggs Manor Neighborhood ParkThis park is located on the far southeast side of Lewisdale, where West Park Drive and Sheridan Street end. The Riggs Manor Neighborhood park is also bounded by the Northwest Branch Anacostia River to the east and East West Highway to the south. The Northwest Branch Trail, also notably, passes by this park. The Riggs Manor Park is a small, quiet park that consists of nothing more than a basketball court and bench.
  Lewisdale Neighborhood ParkThis park is located slightly north of the Riggs Manor Neighborhood Park on West Park Drive.  West Park Drive is interrupted by a small area of woods north of this park. West Park Drive continues north to University Boulevard after the woods ends at Banning Place. Similar to the Riggs Manor Park, the Lewisdale Neighborhood Park includes Northwest Branch Anacostia River to the east. The Northwest Branch Trail also passes by this park. The Lewisdale Neighborhood Park is also a quiet park, like the Riggs Manor Neighborhood Park, except the only difference, is that the park has a little more features. The Lewisdale Neighborhood Park features a small playground area and kickball field in addition to the basketball court it offers.
  Lane Manor Community Park/ Recreation CenterThis park is located on the far north side of Lewisdale, at the intersection of University Boulevard and West Park Drive. Similarly to the Riggs Manor Neighborhood Park and Lewisdale Neighborhood Parks, the Lane Manor Community Park is surrounded by the Northwest Branch Anacostia River. Unlike the other two parks; however, this park is much more busy and full of a lot more action/ park facilities. The Lane Manor Community Park consists of a huge soccer field, a medium-sized playground area, a basketball court, tennis court, a small kickball field, a picnic/ pavilion area, an indoor recreational center facility with a bathroom, and a swimming pool with a small slide. Ice Cream Vending Trucks tend to frequently stop by this park in the spring and summer, since many children and adults buy ice cream at this park when the weather is hot. Additionally, the Lane Manor Community Park is a hot spot for soccer games. Many people play soccer games at this park for leisure, while others join soccer leagues that play competitive soccer games at this park.

Historic sites
The following is a list of historic sites in Lewisdale identified by the Maryland-National Capital Park and Planning Commission:

Commerce

The Lewisdale neighborhood's commercial offerings consist of the Lewisdale Market convenience store, Value Dollar Store, Lowest Price gas station, Adelphi Auto Service, and Value Village thrift store at the intersection of University Boulevard and 23rd Avenue. Value Village has been operating in Toys R' Us' former location since late 1996. (The Lewisdale Toys R' Us moved to a bigger location in the Langley Park Plaza Shopping Center, where it operated until January 31, 2007.) Further west on University Boulevard, the Lewisdale neighborhood features University Gas station, University Mart convenience store, Bestway supermarket, Maxim Nasia Beauty Supply, Hair Cuttery, Coco Cabana Bar & Grill restaurant, Dunkin' Donuts, Baskin-Robbins, Don Pollo restaurant, and Arby's (formerly KFC). The Don Pollo restaurant was built on the former Checkers restaurant location following its closure in mid-2007. In addition to these stores, the Lewisdale neighborhood features the "Riggs Building," an office building that contains a few retail businesses. There used to be a bowling alley in this building. Lewisdale also contains the Green Meadows Shopping Center, which is located near the intersection of East West Highway and Riggs Road. It consists of the Riggs seafood store, Jerk Hill Cafe, Western Union, Crown liquor store, Cricket Wireless store, Dulce Vida bakery, China Sub shop, Mi Pais Latin American market, Spring laundromat and dry cleaners, Los Laurales Mexican/Salvadoran restaurant, and Chicken Loco Peruvian restaurant (which opened in June 2009, replacing the former Mi Jamaica grocery store, which closed around the beginning of 2009).

References

Unincorporated communities in Prince George's County, Maryland
Unincorporated communities in Maryland